The 2011 Conference USA Football Championship Game was played on December 3, 2011 at Robertson Stadium in Houston between Southern Miss and Houston—the winners of Conference USA's East and West Divisions, respectively.

Under C-USA rules, the championship game is hosted by the division champion with the best conference record. Houston finished a  regular season and won the West Division title and hosting rights with its  win over Tulsa on November 25.  Southern Miss booked its place in the championship game the following day with a  win over Memphis.

A win for Houston in the conference's championship game would have earned the university its first bid in the Bowl Championship Series. For the first time, the C-USA Championship was broadcast on ABC, rather than ESPN2 in the past.

References

Championship
Conference USA Football Championship Game
Houston Cougars football games
Southern Miss Golden Eagles football games
Sports competitions in Houston
December 2011 sports events in the United States
Conference USA Football
2011 in Houston